Sleeping Indian may refer to:
Nokhu Crags, a mountain peak in Colorado
Sleeping Indian, the southern end of Sheep Mountain (Teton County, Wyoming)